The 2021–22 NBL season was the 41st season for the Perth Wildcats in the NBL.

The 2022 season marks the first time in 35 years that the Perth Wildcats have not qualified for the finals, having last failed to do so in 1986.

Roster

Pre-season

Ladder

Game log 

|-style="background:#fcc;"
| 1
| 16 November
| Adelaide
| L 56–63
| Law, Wagstaff (11)
| Hodgson, Law (8)
| Cotton, Wagstaff (3)
| MyState Bank Arenanot available
| 0–1
|-style="background:#fcc;"
| 2
| 19 November
| @ Brisbane
| L 100–90
| Bryce Cotton (22)
| Vic Law (6)
| Cotton, Law (5)
| Ulverstone Sports & Leisure Centrenot available
| 0–2
|-style="background:#cfc;"
| 3
| 21 November
| Cairns
| W 96–87
| Vic Law (28)
| Vic Law (12)
| Luke Travers (5)
| Ulverstone Sports & Leisure Centrenot available
| 1–2
|-style="background:#cfc;"
| 4
| 24 November
| Tasmania
| W 98–68
| Bryce Cotton (18)
| Vic Law (9)
| Bryce Cotton (6)
| Ulverstone Sports & Leisure Centrenot available
| 2–2
|-style="background:#fcc;"
| 5
| 26 November
| @ Adelaide
| L 97–93
| Vic Law (24)
| Oliver Hayes-Brown (11)
| Kyle Zunic (5)
| Elphin Sports Centrenot available
| 2–3

Regular season

Ladder

Game log 

|-style="background:#cfc;"
| 1
| 3 December
| Adelaide
| W 85–73
| Vic Law (37)
| Majok Majok (12)
| Bryce Cotton (5)
| RAC Arena11,950
| 1–0
|-style="background:#cfc;"
| 2
| 5 December
| Cairns
| W 90–67
| Bryce Cotton (31)
| Luke Travers (13)
| Bryce Cotton (5)
| RAC Arena10,800
| 2–0
|-style="background:#fcc;"
| 3
| 12 December
| Brisbane
| L 94–97 (2OT)
| Vic Law (29)
| Majok Majok (14)
| Cotton, Travers (5)
| RAC Arena11,295
| 2–1
|-style="background:#cfc;"
| 4
| 17 December
| Brisbane
| W 83–70
| Bryce Cotton (29)
| Law, Travers (9)
| Luke Travers (4)
| RAC Arena11,745
| 3–1
|-style="background:#cfc;"
| 5
| 19 December
| Tasmania
| W 101–83
| Vic Law (32)
| Vic Law (12)
| Cotton, White (6)
| RAC Arena13,615
| 4–1
|-style="background:#cfc;"
| 6
| 31 December
| @ Cairns
| W 78–84
| Bryce Cotton (29)
| Majok Majok (9)
| Bryce Cotton (6)
| Cairns Convention Centre4,339
| 5–1

|-style="background:#fcc;"
| 7
| 18 January
| @ Adelaide
| L 87–74
| Vic Law (16)
| Vic Law (14)
| Michael Frazier II (4)
| Adelaide Entertainment Centre4,758
| 5–2
|-style="background:#cfc;"
| 8
| 22 January
| @ Illawarra
| W 78–94
| Bryce Cotton (24)
| Michael Frazier II (10)
| Mitch Norton (6)
| WIN Entertainment Centre2,278
| 6–2
|-style="background:#cfc;"
| 9
| 27 January
| @ Illawarra
| W 80–94
| Bryce Cotton (28)
| Frazier II, Law (8)
| Mitch Norton (6)
| WIN Entertainment Centre2,240
| 7–2
|-style="background:#fcc;"
| 10
| 30 January
| @ Sydney
| L 96–81
| Cotton, Law (20)
| Vic Law (9)
| Bryce Cotton (4)
| Qudos Bank Arena5,864
| 7–3

|-style="background:#cfc;"
| 11
| 5 February
| @ S.E. Melbourne
| W 79–101
| Luke Travers (24)
| Michael Frazier II (9)
| Bryce Cotton (6)
| John Cain Arena3,727
| 8–3
|-style="background:#fcc;"
| 12
| 12 February
| @ Melbourne
| L 93–87
| Bryce Cotton (31)
| Vic Law (10)
| Cotton, Norton (4)
| John Cain Arena6,401
| 8–4
|-style="background:#fcc;"
| 13
| 19 February
| @ Sydney
| L 98–95
| Bryce Cotton (33)
| Hodgson, Majok, Norton, Travers (5)
| Cotton, Norton (4)
| Qudos Bank Arena7,143
| 8–5
|-style="background:#fcc;"
| 14
| 26 February
| @ S.E. Melbourne
| L 86–80
| Vic Law (22)
| Vic Law (9)
| Mitch Norton (7)
| John Cain Arena3,606
| 8–6
|-style="background:#cfc;"
| 15
| 28 February
| @ Tasmania
| W 78–89
| Bryce Cotton (20)
| Vic Law (13)
| Bryce Cotton (5)
| MyState Bank Arena4,738
| 9–6

|-style="background:#cfc;"
| 16
| 6 March
| @ Adelaide
| W 73–92
| Bryce Cotton (27)
| Vic Law (10)
| Bryce Cotton (7)
| Adelaide Entertainment Centre4,157
| 10–6
|-style="background:#cfc;"
| 17
| 10 March
| @ Melbourne
| W 87–97
| Mitch Norton (26)
| Vic Law (18)
| Bryce Cotton (5)
| John Cain Arena4,169
| 11–6
|-style="background:#cfc;"
| 18
| 12 March
| @ Brisbane
| W 83–95
| Vic Law (24)
| Vic Law (8)
| Vic Law (4)
| Nissan Arena3,202
| 12–6
|-style="background:#cfc;"
| 19
| 14 March
| @ New Zealand
| W 102–104 (OT)
| Vic Law (39)
| Cotton, Law (8)
| Bryce Cotton (8)
| MyState Bank Arenaclosed event
| 13–6
|-style="background:#cfc;"
| 20
| 20 March
| New Zealand
| W 95–85
| Vic Law (26)
| Law, Majok (12)
| Bryce Cotton (6)
| RAC Arena6,927
| 14–6
|-style="background:#fcc;"
| 21
| 24 March
| Tasmania
| L 83–85
| Bryce Cotton (23)
| Vic Law (10)
| Cotton, Travers (5)
| RAC Arena6,678
| 14–7
|-style="background:#fcc;"
| 22
| 26 March
| Sydney
| L 80–102
| Cotton, Travers (20)
| Vic Law (10)
| Kyle Zunic (3)
| RAC Arena6,906
| 14–8

|-style="background:#fcc;"
| 23
| 4 April
| Melbourne
| L 75–84
| Bryce Cotton (18)
| Matt Hodgson (11)
| Cotton, Travers (4)
| RAC Arena10,192
| 14–9
|-style="background:#cfc;"
| 24
| 7 April
| New Zealand
| W 89–80
| Vic Law (18)
| Luke Travers (9)
| Bryce Cotton (5)
| RAC Arena10,270
| 15–9
|-style="background:#fcc;"
| 25
| 14 April
| Adelaide
| L 70–82
| Vic Law (20)
| Matt Hodgson (6)
| Bryce Cotton (5)
| RAC Arena10,272
| 15–10
|-style="background:#cfc;"
| 26
| 16 April
| Cairns
| W 106–87
| Bryce Cotton (22)
| Todd Blanchfield (7)
| Bryce Cotton (10)
| RAC Arena10,314
| 16–10
|-style="background:#fcc;"
| 27
| 22 April
| Illawarra
| L 77–82
| Bryce Cotton (25)
| Majok Majok (10)
| Mitch Norton (8)
| RAC Arena10,251
| 16–11
|-style="background:#fcc;"
| 28
| 24 April
| S.E. Melbourne
| L 100–102 (OT)
| Bryce Cotton (28)
| Matt Hodgson (10)
| Bryce Cotton (8)
| RAC Arena10,271
| 16–12

Transactions

Re-signed

Additions

Subtractions

Awards

Club awards 
 Members MVP: Bryce Cotton
 Coaches’ Award: Jack Purchase
 Players’ Player: Bryce Cotton
 Most Improved Player: Luke Travers
 Best Defensive Player: Mitch Norton
 Club MVP: Bryce Cotton

See also 
 2021–22 NBL season
 Perth Wildcats

References

External links 

 Official Website

Perth Wildcats
Perth Wildcats seasons
Perth Wildcats season